Corey Dewayne Graham (born July 25, 1985) is a former American football free safety. He was drafted by the Chicago Bears in the fifth round of the 2007 NFL Draft. He played college football at New Hampshire. He played for the Baltimore Ravens, Buffalo Bills, and Philadelphia Eagles. Graham is a one-time Pro Bowl selection and two-time Super Bowl champion.

College career
Graham attended the University of New Hampshire, where he played for the New Hampshire Wildcats football team.

Professional career

Chicago Bears
The Chicago Bears selected Graham in the fifth round (168th overall) of the 2007 NFL Draft. He was the 17th cornerback drafted in 2007.

On May 22, 2007, the Chicago Bears signed Graham to a four-year, $1.81 million contract that included a signing bonus of $149,500.

In 2008, Graham started at cornerback alongside longtime Bear Charles Tillman. Graham registered his first career interception on October 19, 2008 off of Minnesota Vikings quarterback Gus Frerotte. Graham also recorded 91 tackles in the 2008 season.

Graham was selected to his first Pro Bowl in 2011 after a season in which he recorded 16 total tackles, deflected three passes, forced a fumble, and caught three interceptions.

Baltimore Ravens
Graham signed with the Baltimore Ravens on March 23, 2012. Graham said that upon signing with the Ravens, he looked to see more time on defense, as well as continuing his solid special teams play.

Graham had a limited role on defense at first, but injuries to Lardarius Webb and Jimmy Smith helped earn him more playing time.

Graham was named the CBS player of the game for the Baltimore Ravens' 2012 Divisional round playoff game  against the top seeded Denver Broncos. In this game, Graham intercepted two Peyton Manning passes and made 8 tackles.  Graham returned his first interception of the game 39 yards for a touchdown, giving the Ravens a 14–7 lead midway through the first quarter.  Graham's second interception of the game occurred in overtime and led to a Ravens game-winning field goal, advancing the team to the AFC championship game. The Ravens entered the game as 9.5 point underdogs, but won the game in double overtime, 38–35, thanks in part to Graham's performance. Graham would call joining the Ravens the second best decision of his life, behind marrying his wife. Graham earned his first Super Bowl ring on February 3, 2013, when the Ravens defeated the San Francisco 49ers in Super Bowl XLVII.

Buffalo Bills
On March 12, 2014, Graham signed a four-year, $16 million contract with the Buffalo Bills. He contributed as a cornerback and on special teams during his first season on the team before being moved to the starting safety position under head coach Rex Ryan.

On March 10, 2017, Graham was released by the Bills after the team signed Micah Hyde and Jordan Poyer.

Philadelphia Eagles
On August 3, 2017, Graham signed a one-year contract with the Philadelphia Eagles reuniting him with former teammates Torrey Smith and Dannell Ellerbe. Graham won his second Super Bowl ring when the Eagles defeated the New England Patriots 41-33 in Super Bowl LII with Graham recording five tackles. Coincidentally, both that game and the other Super Bowl he was part of the winning team on, XLVII, were two of only three Super Bowls in NFL history where both teams recorded at least 30 points, the other being XIII between the Cowboys and Steelers.

On August 5, 2018, Graham re-signed with the Eagles on a one-year deal.

References

External links
 Buffalo Bills bio
 Baltimore Ravens bio

1985 births
Living people
Players of American football from Buffalo, New York
African-American players of American football
American football cornerbacks
New Hampshire Wildcats football players
Chicago Bears players
Baltimore Ravens players
Buffalo Bills players
Philadelphia Eagles players
National Conference Pro Bowl players
21st-century African-American sportspeople
20th-century African-American people